In economics, the theory of fructification is a theory of the interest rate which was proposed by French economist and finance minister Anne Robert Jacques Turgot. The term theory of fructification is due to Eugen von Böhm-Bawerk who considered Turgot as the first economist who tried to develop a scientific explanation of the interest rate.

According to Turgot, a capitalist can either lend his money, or employ it in the purchase of a plot of land. Because fruitful land yields an annual rent forever, its price is given by the formula of a perpetual annuity: If A denotes the land's annual rent and r denotes the interest rate, the land price is simply A/r. From this formula, Turgot concluded that "the lower the interest rate, the more valuable is the land." Specifically, if the interest rate approached zero, the land price would become infinite. Because land prices must be finite, it follows that the interest rate is strictly positive. Turgot argued also that the mechanism which keeps interest rates above zero crowds out inefficient capital formation.

Böhm-Bawerk, who sponsored a different interest theory, considered Turgot's approach as circular. However, according to Joseph Schumpeter, the eminent economic historian, "Turgot's contribution is not only by far the greatest performance in the field of interest theory the eighteenth century produced but it clearly foreshadowed much of the best thought of the last decades of the nineteenth."

Much later, economists demonstrated that the theory of fructification can be stated rigorously in a general equilibrium model. They also generalized Turgot's proposition in two respects. First, land which is useful for residential or industrial purposes can be substituted for agricultural land. Second, in a growing economy, the existence of land implies that the interest rate exceeds the growth rate if the land's income share is bounded away from zero.  The latter result is notable because it states that land ensures dynamic efficiency.

References

Interest
Finance theories
Exponentials
Mathematical finance
Actuarial science
Economic history studies